is a railway station operated by JR West on the Gantoku Line in Iwakuni, Yamaguchi, Japan. It is located in the rural northeastern part of Kuga.

Adjacent stations
West Japan Railway (JR West)

History 

27 September 1990: Station opens

See also
 List of railway stations in Japan

References

External links

  

Railway stations in Japan opened in 1990
Railway stations in Yamaguchi Prefecture